Björn Leo Kotzé (born 11 December 1978) is a Namibian cricketer. He is a right-handed batsman and a right-arm medium-fast bowler.

He has appeared in the ICC Trophy since 1997 and made five One Day International appearances in the World Cup in 2003.

In 2007, Kotzé hit 163 not out against Canada in the ICC Trophy, beating his previous best innings in any fixture for the Namibian team by over 100 runs.

References

External links
 

1978 births
Living people
Cricketers from Windhoek
Namibian cricketers
Namibia One Day International cricketers
Namibian cricket captains